Ogcodocera is a genus of bee flies in the family Bombyliidae. There are at least three described species in Ogcodocera.

Species
These three species belong to the genus Ogcodocera:
 Ogcodocera analis (Williston, 1901) i c g b
 Ogcodocera hedickei (Paramonov, 1930) c g
 Ogcodocera leucoprocta (Wiedemann, 1828) i c g b
Data sources: i = ITIS, c = Catalogue of Life, g = GBIF, b = Bugguide.net

References

Further reading

 

Bombyliidae
Articles created by Qbugbot
Bombyliidae genera